Desmond Lawrence (born November 30, 1994) is a professional Canadian football defensive back for the Winnipeg Blue Bombers of the Canadian Football League (CFL).

College career
Lawrence played college football for the North Carolina Tar Heels from 2013 to 2016. He played in 47 games where he had 178 total tackles, six tackles for a loss, 1.5 sacks, three interceptions, and one forced fumble.

Professional career

Detroit Lions
Lawrence signed with the Detroit Lions as an undrafted free agent on May 12, 2017. However, he was injured during training camp and was moved to the reserve/injured list in 2018. He was released in the following off-season on April 6, 2018.

Atlanta Legends
Lawrence played for the Atlanta Legends in 2019, but the Alliance of American Football folded after the eighth game of play.

DC Defenders
In 2020, Lawrence played for the DC Defenders, but the XFL ceased operations mid-season due to the COVID-19 pandemic.

Hamilton Tiger-Cats
Lawrence signed with the Hamilton Tiger-Cats on February 17, 2021. He made the team following training camp and played in his first career professional game on August 5, 2021, against the Winnipeg Blue Bombers. He played in 10 regular season games where he had 22 defensive tackles, three special teams tackles, one sack, and two interceptions. At the end of the season, he was the team's nominee for the CFL's Most Outstanding Rookie Award.

In 2022 with the Tiger-Cats, he spent the majority of the year on the practice roster and played in just five games where he had four defensive tackles and two special teams tackles. He was released on October 1, 2022.

Winnipeg Blue Bombers
On October 5, 2022, it was announced that Lawrence had signed a practice roster agreement with the Winnipeg Blue Bombers.

References

External links
 Winnipeg Blue Bombers bio

1994 births
Living people
American football defensive backs
American players of Canadian football
Canadian football defensive backs
Hamilton Tiger-Cats players
Players of American football from North Carolina
Sportspeople from Charlotte, North Carolina
North Carolina Tar Heels football players
Winnipeg Blue Bombers players